Three ships of the Japanese Navy have been named Hirado:

  was a  launched in 1911 and struck in 1940
  was an  launched in 1943 and scrapped in 1947
  is an 

Japanese Navy ship names
Imperial Japanese Navy ship names